Back from the Grave, Volume 10, released on LP in 2015, is the tenth and to this date latest installment in the Back from the Grave series of garage rock compilations.  As indicated in the subheading which reads "Snarling Snotty Mid 60s Teenage Garage Punk Hoot!," this collection consists of many songs which display the rawer and more aggressive side of the genre and are often characterized by the use of fuzztone-distorted  guitars and rough vocals.  In typical fashion, the set generally excludes psychedelic, folk rock, and pop-influenced material in favor of basic primitive rock and roll.  

The packaging contains well-researched liner notes written by Chris Bishop of Garage Hangover.com  which convey basic information about each song and group, such as origin, recording date, and biographical sketches, as well as photographs of the bands.  The cover artwork features a highly satirical cartoon diorama by Olaf Jens wrapping around the front and back sides of the sleeve depicting the usual revivified zombies whose methods of punishment seem reminiscent of antiquated practices used at medieval inquisitions and heresy trials, and whom on this occasion have taken upon themselves to employ the use of a sheaved hatchet-man in hooded garb to exact earthly penalties for what they consider to be the mortal sin of straying the slightest inch from their well-stated doctrine of rock & roll purity, which in their mind, indicts most forms of rock that follow 1960s garage, such as glitter rock, alternative, and heavy metal, and they have lined up a crew of condemned personages beginning with Ziggy Stardust, displayed on the front cover, whose neck has been placed upon the chopping-block, followed by others awaiting their fate, such as Slash of Guns N' Roses fame, who are depicted on the backside of the wraparound mural.  

The album begins with the pulsating "Wild Angel," by James Bond & The Agents.  The highly suggestive "69" by the Four, from Brownville, Tennessee is set to a crunching Kink's style guitar riff and was recorded at Sam Phillips' Sun Studio in Memphis.  The highly fuzzed-drenched "Return to Innocence" is by the Expressions, from Ringgold Georgia, and previously appeared on the Destination Frantic Volume Three compilation, put out by Zone 66 Records.  The Hotbeats from Bristol, Rhode Island express a flair for the oft-maintained male "one-track-mind" attitude in "Listen."  "Young Miss Larsen" is by the Color and works up to a fast-paced rave-up.  The set closes with GMC and the Arcelles humorous send up of the Sonics' "The Witch."

Track listing

Side one
James Bond and the Agents: "Wild Angel"    
John English III and the Heathens: "I Need You Near"    
The Four: "69"    
The Expressions: "Return to Innocence"    
The Orphans: "Without You"    
The Sires: "Don't Look Now"    
It's Them/TTHHEMM: "Baby (I Still Want Your Lovin')"

Side two
   
The Orphans: "Hey Gyp"    
Nobodys Children: "Mother's Tin Moustache"    
South' Soul: "Lost"    
The Hotbeats: "Listen"    
The Hard Times: "Mr. Rolling Stone"    
Four More: "Problem Child"    
The Color: "Young Miss Larsen"    
GMC and the Arcelles: "The Witch"

Catalogue and release information

LP (Crypt, 2015)

Back from the Grave, Volumes 9 and 10 (CD)

Back from the Grave, Volumes 9 and 10 (CD), is numerically, though not chronologically, the fifth installment in the series of Back from the Grave of garage rock compilations released on compact disk in 2015  which, unlike the previous set of CD releases issued between 1996-2000, which it will be replacing, attempts to faithfully replicate the contents of the Back from the Grave LPs, which will bring the series for the first time into multi-medium coherence.  Like all of the entries in the series it was assembled by Tim Warren of Crypt Records.  The CD is enclosed in a Digipack which, features a highly satirical wraparound cartoon by Olaf Jens (taken from the Volume 9 LP).  In the foldout of one of two the booklets enclosed is another satirical cartoon by Olaf Jens taken from the front cover of the Volume 10 LP.  The two booklets contain well-researched liner notes written by Chris Bishop of Garage Hangover.com  which convey basic information about each song and group, such as origin, recording date, and biographical sketches, as well as photographs of the bands.  Each booklet's information corresponds to the tracks on one of the LPs, the first for Volume 9 and the second for Volume 10.  The track list to the Volumes 5 and 6 CD is identical to the corresponding LPs.

Track listing

The Pastels: "Circuit Breaker"    
The High Spirits: "It's Alright with Me"    
The Warlocks: "Beware"    
The Emeralds: "Like Father Like Son"    
The Why-Nots: "Tamborine"    
The Turncoats: "Something Better"    
The Classics: "I'm Hurtin'"    
The Raevins: "The Edgge Of Time"    
Lord Charles & The Prophets: "Don't Ask Me No Questions"    
The Gentlemen: "It's a Cry'n Shame"    
The Shakles: "Whizz #7"    
Unknown Artist: "When I Feel Better"    
Knoll Allen and the Noble Savages: "Animal"    
The Donshires: "Sad and Blue"    
The Starfyres: "No Room for Your Love"    
James Bond and the Agents: "Wild Angel"    
John English III and the Heathens: "I Need You Near"    
The Four: "69"    
The Expressions: "Return to Innocence"    
The Orphans: "Without You"    
The Sires: "Don't Look Now"    
It's Them/TTHHEMM: "Baby (I Still Want Your Lovin')"    
The Orphans: "Hey Gyp"    
Nobodys Children: "Mother's Tin Moustache"    
South' Soul: "Lost"    
The Hotbeats: "Listen"    
The Hard Times: "Mr. Rolling Stone"    
Four More: "Problem Child"    
The Color: "Young Miss Larsen"    
GMC and the Arcelles: "The Witch"

Catalogue and release information

Compact disc (Crypt-114 CD, rel. 2015)

References

Back from the Grave (series)
2015 compilation albums